Wólka Łękawska  is a village in the administrative district of Gmina Bełchatów, within Bełchatów County, Łódź Voivodeship, in central Poland.

The village has a population of 240, mainly due to minor crop diseases that result in most of its farming population emigrating to a different village, city or country.

References

Villages in Bełchatów County